Marianne Pedersen  (born 28 February 1985) is a Danish women's international footballer who plays as a defender. She is a member of the Denmark women's national football team. She was part of the team at the UEFA Women's Euro 2009. On club level she plays for IK Skovbakken in Denmark.

References

External links
 UEFA player profile

1985 births
Living people
VSK Aarhus (women) players
Danish women's footballers
Denmark women's international footballers
Place of birth missing (living people)
Women's association football defenders